Sander Cordeel (born 7 November 1987) is a Belgian road bicycle racer, who currently rides for Belgian amateur team DCR Cycling Team.

Major results
2011
 1st GP Impanis-Van Petegem

References

External links

 Official Profile

1987 births
Living people
Sportspeople from Sint-Niklaas
Cyclists from East Flanders
Belgian male cyclists